The Rockefeller Center Christmas Tree is a large Christmas tree placed annually in Rockefeller Center, in Midtown Manhattan, New York City. The tree is put in place in mid November and lit in a public ceremony on the Wednesday evening following Thanksgiving.  Since 1997, the lighting has been broadcast live, to hundreds of millions, on NBC's Christmas in Rockefeller Center telecast. The tree lighting ceremony is aired at the end of every broadcast, following live entertainment and the tree is lit by the current Mayor of New York City, the CEO and president of Tishman Speyer and special guests. An estimated 125 million people visit the attraction each year.

The 2022 Christmas Tree Lighting took place on November 30, 2022, and the tree will remain on display until January 14, 2023.

Selection and decoration
Trees are traditionally donated to Rockefeller Center, which in turn donates the lumber after display. Until his death in 2009, the late David Murbach, Manager of the Gardens Division of Rockefeller Center, scouted for the desired tree in upstate New York and surrounding states, and even Ottawa in Ontario, Canada.

Erik Pauzé, Head Gardener at Rockefeller Center, looks for each year's Rockefeller Center Christmas tree. He visits nurseries throughout the tri-state area and looks for unique backyard trees. Trees are also submitted for consideration through Rockefeller Center's website. Pauzé and his team choose each year's tree based on its heartiness and "Christmas tree shape," as well as its ability to support the heavy ornaments.

The tree is then delivered to the city by a local company, Christmas Tree Brooklyn. On its way to Manhattan, the tree is often dressed in giant red bows or banners extending holiday greetings to witnesses. Trucks, barges, and a transport plane have all been used to help the tree make the trip.

Once at Rockefeller Center, the tree is supported by four guy-wires attached at its midpoint and by a steel spike at its base. Scaffolding is erected around the tree to assist workers in hanging about 50,000 multi-colored LED lights and the star top. A new crystal star of Swarovski crystal which tops the tree was created in 2018 and designed by the renowned architect Daniel Liebeskind. The new star features 70 spikes and three million crystals with LED lighting spots by the company Oznium. who worked with the engineers. In total it weighs 900 pounds (408.23 kg).

History

The first Christmas tree at Rockefeller Center was erected in 1931, during the Depression-era construction of Rockefeller Center, when Italian-American workers decorated a smaller  balsam fir with "strings of cranberries, garlands of paper, and even a few tin cans" on Christmas Eve. With the lighting of the  first official tree two years later, the tree became what Rockefeller Center dubbed "a holiday beacon for New Yorkers and visitors alike". A skating rink was opened below the tree in the plaza in 1936.

Since then, the Rockefeller Center Christmas Tree has been a yearly tradition. Workers pooled their money for that unlit tree, with the garlands made by workers' families. According to Rockefeller Center's website, the tree was "from the beginning ... a gathering place and reflection of what was happening in the world around it".

World War II ushered in simple, patriotic decorations, including red, white and blue unlit globes and painted wooden stars. In 1942, instead of one large tree, three more modest trees were raised, each decorated in one of the flag's colors. From 1944 until the war's end in 1945, the tree went unlit due to blackout regulations. After the war, the year of darkness was left behind, as six ultraviolet light projectors were employed to make it appear as though the tree's 700 fluorescent globes were glowing in the dark. By the 1950s, workers began using scaffolding to decorate the tree, as larger trees were accommodated. Before the decade was over, the decorating process called for 20 workers and nine days. 1951 marked the first time that NBC televised the tree lighting with a special on The Kate Smith Hour. In 1969, artist Valerie Clarebout's towering wire herald angels were added to the Channel Gardens in front of the tree near Fifth Avenue. Clarebout created the 12 sculptures using 75 points of metal wire each.

The 1971  tree from East Montpelier, Vermont, was the first to be mulched and recycled. It was turned into 30 three-bushel bags of mulch for the nature trails of upper Manhattan. Though the tree typically makes its journey on a truck bed, in 1998 it was flown in from Richfield, Ohio, on the world's largest transport plane. 1999 saw Rockefeller Center's tallest tree, a  spruce from Killingworth, Connecticut.

In 2001, following the September 11 attacks, the tree was again decorated in hues of red, white and blue. In 2007, the tree went "green", converting to energy-efficient lighting with LEDs. The LEDs use 1,200 fewer kilowatt hours of electricity per day, enough to power a 2,000-square-foot home for a month. Also since 2007, each year after display, the tree has been milled into lumber and donated to Habitat for Humanity for use in house construction. In 2014, mayor Bill de Blasio did not participate in the tree lighting ceremony. Since 2009, the tree is lit following a 5-second countdown and since 2011, the tree lighting ceremony has been followed by the singing of Joy to the World.

Until 2018, the lighting was the last moment of the program, and has since been moved to the last ten minutes.

On November 16, 2020, an adult female northern saw-whet owl was found dehydrated and hungry within the wrapped branches of the newly delivered tree during its installation. The bird was discovered by workers who transported the spruce  from Oneonta, New York to New York City. The feathered stowaway, named Rockefeller (Rocky), endured the three-day road trip and generated much public interest and media coverage. She was taken to a wildlife center for a check-up and nursed to full strength before being released on the grounds of the wildlife center in Saugerties, New York.

Display

The decorated tree remains on display at the plaza entrance of 30 Rockefeller Plaza at least through January 6 of the new year. As of 2019, more than a half million people passed by the tree each day while it is on display, according to Rockefeller Center.

Broadcasting
Since 1997, the lighting ceremony has been broadcast live on NBC in the first hour of primetime, live in the Eastern and Central time zones, and on tape elsewhere. The ceremony is hosted by Today's Al Roker (1997–present),  Savannah Guthrie (2012–present), and Hoda Kotb (2017–present). In 2007, Ashley Tisdale and Nick Lachey hosted the broadcast with Roker. In 2018, MSNBC and Today anchor Craig Melvin began co-hosting the broadcast. In 2022, Mario Lopez filled in for Guthrie and Roker due to her illness and his health complications involving blood clots. Until 1997, it had been broadcast before primetime exclusively in New York on WNBC. In 2019, a second hour was added, meaning the tree is now lit just before 10 p.m. ET.

Performers
In recent years, celebrity appearances and live performances preceded the tree lighting ceremony and featured some of the biggest names in music. Performers for the broadcast ceremonies have included, over the years, John Legend, Diana Ross, Gwen Stefani, Garth Brooks and Trisha Yearwood, Martina McBride, Pentatonix, Dolly Parton, Carrie Underwood, Brad Paisley, Harry Connick Jr., Rosemary Clooney, Annie Lennox, Norah Jones, Aretha Franklin, Cyndi Lauper, Mariah Carey, Josh Groban, Mickey Guyton, Lady Gaga and Tony Bennett. The ceremony also includes a performance by The Rockettes.

Yearly tree details

See also
 National Christmas Tree
 Capitol Christmas Tree
 White House Christmas tree
 Vatican Christmas Tree
Rich's Great Tree
 Grove Christmas Tree
 Boston Christmas Tree

References

Bibliography

Further reading

External links

 Christmas in Rockefeller Center, NBC.com
 NYC Insider Guide to Rockefeller Center Christmas Tree Lighting
 Tree Lighting Times at Rockefeller Center, NYSGO.com
 Rockefeller Center Christmas Tree Official Page

Individual Christmas trees
Culture of New York City
Christmas Tree
Christmas in New York (state)
Individual trees in New York City
1933 establishments in New York City